Barrett Mountain is a mountain located in south-central New Hampshire within the Wapack Range of mountains. It lies within the town of New Ipswich and is traversed by the  Wapack Trail. Kidder Mountain is located directly to the north along the Wapack ridgeline; New Ipswich Mountain to the south. The summit of the mountain is mostly wooded. A cross-country ski area occupies the north side of Barrett Mountain.

The east side of the mountain drains into the Souhegan River watershed, to the Merrimack River thence the Atlantic Ocean; the northwest side drains into the Gridley River, to the Contoocook River thence into the Merrimack River;  the southwest side drains into the Millers River watershed, to the Connecticut River, thence into Long Island Sound.

References

Southern New Hampshire Trail Guide (1999). Boston: The Appalachian Mountain Club.
Flanders, John (1991) Wapack Trail Guide. West Peterborough, New Hampshire: Friends of the Wapack.

External links
"Friends of the Wapack".

Mountains of Hillsborough County, New Hampshire
Mountains of New Hampshire
New Ipswich, New Hampshire